Thespianz Theatre is a social performing arts organization established in 2005 in Pakistan staged more than 56 social theater, string puppetry and mime plays including education, gender inequality, women's rights drugs prevention, anti book piracy theatre and flash mobs, HIV Aids and water scarcity around the country. All  are solely directed by the artistic director Faisal Malik and his associate director Nouman Mehmood., who took the Thespianz Theatre troupe to 18 countries around the world

Thespianz Theatre revived old dying art of string puppetry in Pakistan and staged Pakistan's biggest string puppetry festival with more than 300 performances in 79 areas of Karachi, Pakistan.

In October 2016, the theatre organised the Pakistan String Puppetry Festival in Karachi. The festival lasted from October 2016 to January 2017. The festival endeavors to charm audiences, raise awareness and urges the rejection of extremism and violence.

References 

Puppet theaters
Theatre companies in Pakistan
2005 establishments in Pakistan
Performing groups established in 2005